Crosby is a city in Crow Wing County, Minnesota, United States. The population was 2,386 at the 2010 census. It is part of the Brainerd Micropolitan Statistical Area. Crosby is adjacent to its twin city of Ironton, in the Cuyuna iron range.

History
Crosby was built for the sole purpose of mining. It was named for George H. Crosby, a businessman in the mining industry.

Crosby was the location of Minnesota's worst mining disaster, the Milford Mine disaster. On February 5, 1924, a new tunnel was blasted too close to nearby Foley Lake, and water rushed in, killing 41 miners.

In the 1932 local elections, Karl Emil Nygard was elected president of Crosby's Village Council, making it the first city in the United States to have a Communist mayor.

The flight, which was launched from Crosby's  Portsmouth Mine Pit Lake, helped the United States take its fledgling steps into space exploration. Simons returned to Crosby in 2007 to mark the 50th anniversary of the project.

Geography
Crosby is in eastern Crow Wing County at the intersection of Minnesota Highways 6 and 210. Ironton is adjacent to the west and Deerwood lies to the east along route 210. Serpent Lake is adjacent to the southeast and the Cuyuna Country State Recreation Area is to the northwest. The Mississippi River flows by four miles to the north.

Demographics

2010 census
As of the census of 2010, there were 2,386 people, 1,065 households, and 552 families living in the city. The racial makeup of the city was 96.3% White, 0.4% African American, 1.1% Native American, 0.6% Asian, 0.1% from other races, and 1.5% from two or more races. Hispanic or Latino of any race were 1.3% of the population.

There were 1,065 households, of which 27.5% had children under the age of 18 living with them, 32.3% were married couples living together, 13.8% had a female householder with no husband present, 5.7% had a male householder with no wife present, and 48.2% were non-families. 42.3% of all households were made up of individuals, and 22.8% had someone living alone who was 65 years of age or older. The average household size was 2.13 and the average family size was 2.88.

The median age in the city was 43.2 years. 23.3% of residents were under the age of 18; 7.7% were between the ages of 18 and 24; 20.5% were from 25 to 44; 24.3% were from 45 to 64, and 24.2% were 65 years of age or older. The gender makeup of the city was 46.7% male and 53.3% female.

2000 census
As of the census of 2000, there were 2,299 people, 989 households, and 554 families living in the city. The racial makeup of the city was 97.69% White, 0.04% African American, 0.91% Native American, 0.22% Asian, 0.09% Pacific Islander, 0.35% from other races, and 0.70% from two or more races. Hispanic or Latino of any race were 1.00% of the population. 23.9% were of German, 14.1% Norwegian, 11.7% Swedish, 9.6% American and 7.0% English ancestry according to Census 2000.

There were 989 households, out of which 27.6% had children under the age of 18 living with them, 40.3% were married couples living together, 11.8% had a female householder with no husband present, and 43.9% were non-families. 39.4% of all households were made up of individuals, and 21.2% had someone living alone who was 65 years of age or older. The average household size was 2.18 and the average family size was 2.93.

In the city, the population was spread out, with 24.4% under the age of 18, 8.1% from 18 to 24, 21.9% from 25 to 44, 20.0% from 45 to 64, and 25.6% who were 65 years of age or older. The median age was 42 years. For every 100 females, there were 85.3 males. For every 100 females age 18 and over, there were 79.5 males.

The median income for a household in the city was $24,053, and the median income for a family was $31,629. Males had a median income of $28,879 versus $20,842 for females. The per capita income for the city was $15,465. About 15.6% of families and 16.9% of the population were below the poverty line, including 17.8% of those under age 18 and 12.9% of those age 65 or over.

Notable people
 Nick Anderson, pitcher for the Atlanta Braves
 Anthony "The Bullet" Bonsante, boxer
 Robert A. Good, physician
 Leon S. Kennedy, actor
 Rick Nolan, politician
 Karl Emil Nygard, first Communist mayor in the United States
 Thomas W. Simons Jr., U.S. Ambassador to Poland and Pakistan
 Howard E. Smith, businessman and Minnesota state legislator

References

External links
City of Crosby, MN – Official Website
Cuyuna Lakes Chamber of Commerce – Visitor Information site

 Cities in Minnesota
 Minnesota populated places on the Mississippi River
 Cities in Crow Wing County, Minnesota
 Brainerd, Minnesota micropolitan area
 Mining communities in Minnesota